Arturo Lezama Bagez (1899–1964) was a Uruguayan political figure.

Background

Lezama was a prominent member of the Uruguayan Colorado Party which ruled the country for lengthy periods, and was President of the Chamber of Deputies in 1951 and 1953. In 1957 his fellow-Colorado colleague President Alberto Fermín Zubiría stepped down from office.

President of Uruguay
In 1955 Lezama was elected a member of the National Council of Government, which he presided 1957–1958. That year started the exploration in search for petroleum on Uruguayan territory.

He was succeeded by Carlos Fischer, a Colorado Party colleague.

Death

Lezama died in 1964.

See also

 Politics of Uruguay
 Colorado Party (Uruguay)

References

 :es:Arturo Lezama

1899 births
1964 deaths
Uruguayan people of Basque descent
Colorado Party (Uruguay) politicians
Presidents of the Chamber of Representatives of Uruguay
Presidents of the National Council of Government (Uruguay)